The 1983 Jameson International Open was a professional ranking snooker tournament that took place between 1 and 9 October 1983 at the Eldon Square Recreation Centre in Newcastle-upon-Tyne, England. Steve Davis won the tournament, beating Cliff Thorburn 9–4 in the final. Television coverage was on ITV.

Summary
The defending champion Tony Knowles was defeated by John Spencer in the last 16 round.

Cliff Thorburn beat Terry Griffiths 9–8 in the first semi-final after winning the last four frames. At one stage Griffiths had led 5–1. Steve Davis beat Eddie Charlton 9–2 in the second semi-final.

Steve Davis met Cliff Thorburn in the final. Davis led 6–2 after the afternoon session and eventually won 9–4. He took the first prize of £24,000 for his win and another £1,500 for the high break prize, for a break of 120 against Mike Watterson at the last-16 stage.

Main draw

Qualifying
The final qualifying round was played at the Romiley Forum in Stockport in September.

Final qualifying round

References

Scottish Open (snooker)
Sport in Newcastle upon Tyne
International Open
International Open
International Open
International Open
20th century in Newcastle upon Tyne